Gregory "Greg" Franchi (born 6 April 1982, in Flémalle) is a Belgian racing driver.

Career

Karting
Franchi began his karting career in 2000, with the 36th place in European Championship Formula A.

Formula Ford
Franchi make debut in his formula racing career in French Formula Ford championship where he finished as runner-up.

Formula Renault
After race at Autódromo do Estoril in the Formula Renault 2000 Eurocup in 2001, he remained for 2002, but switched to ADM Junior Team. He finished 39th without scoring a point. Also he participated in three races of the Italian Formula Renault Championship with the same team.

Formula Three
In 2003, Franchi stepped up to the Italian Formula Three Championship with the Lucidi Motors team. He finished third in the standings after taking four podium places. Also he appeared as a guest driver at Circuit de Spa-Francorchamps in British Formula 3.

Franchi moved to Signature and the Formula 3 Euro Series in 2004, finishing season on the 29th position. He remained in series for the following season, but switched to the Prema Powerteam. He improved to seventeenth place in the standings and scored four points.

Formula Renault 3.5 Series
In 2006 he stepped up to the Formula Renault 3.5 Series with Prema Powerteam. He took ten points, finishing in third place at Monaco race that was part of the Formula One Grand Prix weekend. It was single points for him and he received 25th final position in standings.

Touring car and GT racing
In 2007, Franchi moved to touring car and GT racing, competing in series such as Eurocup Mégane Trophy, FIA GT, Belcar and FFSA GT Championship.

Racing record

Career summary

Complete Formula 3 Euro Series results
(key) (Races in bold indicate pole position) (Races in italics indicate fastest lap)

Complete Formula Renault 3.5 Series results
(key) (Races in bold indicate pole position) (Races in italics indicate fastest lap)

References

External links
 Official site
 Gregory Franchi career statistics at Driver Database

1982 births
Living people
People from Flémalle
Belgian people of Italian descent
Belgian racing drivers
Italian Formula Renault 2.0 drivers
Formula Renault Eurocup drivers
Italian Formula Three Championship drivers
British Formula Three Championship drivers
Formula 3 Euro Series drivers
European Le Mans Series drivers
FIA GT Championship drivers
World Series Formula V8 3.5 drivers
Blancpain Endurance Series drivers
24 Hours of Spa drivers
Prema Powerteam drivers
Sportspeople from Liège Province
Aston Martin Racing drivers
Larbre Compétition drivers
Signature Team drivers
Phoenix Racing drivers
W Racing Team drivers